Background is the fifth studio album by the Italian rapper Bassi Maestro, released in 2002 under Vibrarecords.

Track listing

Link 

2002 albums
Bassi Maestro albums